Shēn is the pinyin romanization of the Chinese surname .

Shen is the 298th surname in the Song-era Hundred Family Surnames.

Romanisation
申 is romanised as Shin in Korean and Thân in Vietnamese.

Distribution
Shen is unlisted among the 100 most common surname in mainland China in 2007 or among the 100 most common surnames on Taiwan in 2005.

Likewise, although Chinese make up the largest part of America's Asian and Pacific Islander population, none of the romanizations of 申 appeared among the 1000 most common surnames during the AD 2000 US census.

Nonetheless, it is regionally popular in the Jiangsu and Zhejiang region around the mouth of the Yangtze River.

In Korea Shin is the 13th most common surname (sorted by Hanja character).

Origin
As is common with Chinese surnames, the modern Shen family arose from various unrelated sources.

One origin of the Shen was the state of Shen (申) established by the Si family during the Xia dynasty. During the early Zhou dynasty, the state of Jiang conquered this Shen and its people migrated south to Shenlu in Chu, adopting Shen as their clan name.

Another origin of the Shen was with a second state of Shen (also 申). This Shen was originally ruled by the Ying dynasty, who claimed descent from a son of the Ku Emperor named Shishen. When this Shen was destroyed by King Zhao of Zhou, its rulers and vassals also adopted Shen as their clan name.

A third state of Shen (also 申) was ruled by a cadet branch of the Zhou royal family, whose ancestral name was Jiang (姜), and arose from territory granted to King Xuan's maternal uncle from the lands of the former state of Xie. This land's rulers and people also ended in adopting the region as their clan name following its destruction.

References

Chinese-language surnames
Individual Chinese surnames